Germán Mailhos (24 February 1933 – 30 December 2005) was a Uruguayan equestrian. He competed in two events at the 1960 Summer Olympics.

References

1933 births
2005 deaths
Uruguayan male equestrians
Olympic equestrians of Uruguay
Equestrians at the 1960 Summer Olympics
Sportspeople from Montevideo